Constituency NA-143 may refer to:

 NA-143 (Okara-III), a present constituency (after 2018 delimitation)
 NA-143 (Okara-I), a former constituency based on 2002 delimitation

National Assembly Constituencies of Pakistan